This is a list of Croatian television related events from 1977.

Events

Debuts

Television shows

Ending this year

Births
12 September - Daria Knez, actress

Deaths